Visakha Football Club is a Cambodian professional football club based in Phnom Penh. Founded in 2016, it currently competes in the Cambodian Premier League. The club won the 2020 Hun Sen Cup, therefore qualifies for the play-offs round of the 2021 AFC Cup.

Current squad

Out on loan

Players with multiple nationalities 
Leng Nora

Official

Record

Continental

National
Hun Sen Cup: 
 Champion: 2020, 2021
Cambodian Second League: 
 Champion: 2017

References 

Football clubs in Cambodia